Panihati Mahavidyalaya, established in 1976, is a general degree college in Sodepur, West Bengal, India, near Kolkata. It offers undergraduate courses in arts, commerce and Sciences. It is affiliated to West Bengal State University.

Departments

Science
Chemistry (honours & general)
Physics (honours & general)
Mathematics  (honours & general)
Zoology (honours & general)
Computer science (honours & general)
Botany (general)

Arts and commerce
Bengali (honours & general)
Education (honours & general)
English (honours & general) 
History (honours & general)
Geography (honours & general)
Political science (honours & general)
Philosophy (honours & general)
Sanskrit (honours & general)
Economics (general)
Journalism and mass communication (General)
Sociology (general)
Psychology (general)
Commerce (honours & general)

Accreditation
Panihati Mahavidyalaya is recognized by the University Grants Commission (UGC). It is affiliated to West Bengal State University.

See also
Education in India
List of colleges in West Bengal
Education in West Bengal

References

External links
Panihati Mahavidyalaya

Educational institutions established in 1976
Colleges affiliated to West Bengal State University
Universities and colleges in North 24 Parganas district
1976 establishments in West Bengal